Pat O'Keeffe (17 March 1883 – 16 August 1960, spelled by many sources as Pat O'Keefe), was a professional English boxer who became the British champion in both the welterweight and middleweight weight classes. His professional career spanned the years between 1902 and 1918. In 1914 he made an unsuccessful bid for the European heavyweight belt, losing to Georges Carpentier. Between 1907 and 1910 he left Britain and continued his boxing career in the United States, and then Australia. On the outbreak of World War I he joined the British Army to work as a Physical Training Instructor (PTI) and Recruiting Sergeant for the 1st Surrey Rifles. He won the Lonsdale Belt outright when he defeated Bandsman Blake at the National Sporting Club (N.S.C) on 28 January 1918, becoming British Middleweight Champion.

O'Keeffe died on 16 August 1960 at the Mount Vernon Hospital in Middlesex, aged 77.

Professional boxing

Early career: 1902-1907
One of O'Keeffe's earliest recorded fights was against Jack Palmer. O'Keeffe defeated him on two occasions over six rounds during 1902. In 1903, at the age of twenty, he beat Jack Kingsland in a match fought at the Olympia centre in London to win the title of Welterweight Champion of England.

In 1906, having fought many of the top contenders for the British Middleweight Title, O'Keeffe was elected to contest the championship. He won the title beating Mike Crawley in a fight that lasted fifteen rounds.

One month later, O'Keeffe defended the title against Charlie Allum and knocked him out in the sixth round. O'Keeffe lost the belt in his next bout to Tom Thomas at the National Sporting Club (N.S.C.) by a narrow points margin.

A year later in Paris, O'Keeffe defeated Allum again by knock out and won £200. This bout was billed the French Middleweight Championship. O'Keeffe never defended the claim.

International career: 1907-1910
After losing the British Middleweight Championship title, O'Keeffe travelled the world and fought all over the United States and Australia.

In 1907, he fought World Middleweight Champion Billy Papke and World Welterweight Champion Henry Lewis with just over a month's rest between bouts. The match in Philadelphia with Papke was very hard-fought, ending in a draw. He lost his bout with Henry Lewis in Boston, Massachusetts by decision. His next fight was against Willie Lewis originally scheduled for 19 December 1907, but the police placed an injunction on the venue in New York . The fight went ahead on 23 December 1907. W.Lewis is said to have entered O'Keeffe's dressing room just before the fight, berating his apparent belly, quipping that he might kill him if he punched him there. O'Keeffe lost by knock out. Despite not winning a bout in the US, O'Keeffe was upbeat and in February 1908, he returned to England. He placed a message in the Sporting Life, declaring  "he is here for business", in a wide-ranging article that revealed he contracted malaria in the US. The article claimed that anyone who wanted to challenge the statement need only send money to the Sporting Life, with correspondence addressed to O'Keeffe and it would receive his immediate attention.

Answering O'Keeffe's message in the Sporting Life, fellow Canning Town boxer Steve Smith took on O'Keeffe at the Wonderland Francais, Paris, the match ended in a draw. Less than two weeks later at the same venue, he was disqualified for a low blow in the fourth round against Jeff Thorne.

Later that year, O'Keeffe toured Australia with Tommy Burns, the World Heavyweight Champion. At  Burns is the shortest boxer ever to hold the title which he won in 1906. He also managed to successfully defend it eleven times against all claimants until he met with Jack Johnson on Boxing Day in 1908.

While in Australia, O'Keeffe and Burns trained together and used to invite the public to watch these exhibitions of their skills.

O'Keeffe fought a number of contests in Australia, mostly against heavier opponents, winning two, drawing one and losing three.

Late career: 1911–1918
He did not fight again in England until 1911, when he fought Eddie McGoorty, losing on points over fifteen rounds. McGoorty went on to become world champion in 1915. After this loss O'Keeffe won his next five fights between 1911 and 1913. His next defeat was a points decision against Private Jim Harris which he reversed over twenty rounds two months later, after defeating Frank Mantell twice in seven days.

On 4 August 1913 he challenged Bombardier Billy Wells for the British Heavyweight Championship. He was a tall heavyweight who was almost three stones heavier than O'Keeffe, but it took fifteen rounds before Wells succeeded in knocking him out.

O'Keeffe's next bout was against the young prodigy Georges Carpentier. The match was billed as the Heavyweight Championship of Europe although both men were under the light heavyweight weight limit. He was knocked out in two rounds by the man who, at the time, appeared capable of beating all of Europe's boxers in quick succession. O'Keeffe gave a simple no-nonsense reason for his defeat to the Sheffield Daily Telegraph: "He was too big and strong for me."

His next fight was against Henry Reeve for the British Middleweight Championship on 2 February 1914. O'Keeffe won on points over twenty rounds. Later Reeve moved up to the light heavyweight division and won the British championship in 1916 against Dick Smith.

O'Keeffe successfully defended his middleweight title two months later against Nichol Simpson. In May of the same year he earned a second notch on his belt by defeating Jim Sullivan who had himself held the belt in 1910 when he beat an old adversary of O'Keeffe's, Tom Thomas. O'Keeffe earned £650 for winning this fight.

A year later in March 1915, he fought and knocked out the heavyweight, Joe Beckett in eight rounds. Following this O'Keeffe had a return fight with Jim Sullivan. Although it was billed as being for the British Middleweight Title, the fight was not endorsed by the N.S.C; therefore, the Lonsdale Belt was not at stake on this occasion. The two met again on 21 February 1916. Jimmy Wilde, the former Flyweight champion, described the fight as the most punishing he had ever seen. Both men fought as though their lives depended on it. The ring and spectators sitting nearby were splashed with blood by the end of the battle and it can be seen from photographs of the event that Sullivan's white shorts were dark with blood by the end of twenty rounds when O'Keeffe gained the decision. Two months later he fought Bandsman Blake and knocked him out in the thirteenth round. Blake had a fine record at this stage having lost to only one man to date in his five-year professional career, Bombardier Billy Wells.

Just three months later, on 22 May 1916, O'Keeffe was at the N.S.C to fight Bandsman Blake again. The £500 match went the full 20 rounds. "The contest was not a good one" according to the Sheffield Independent. In the 12th round, the referee gave both fighters a last warning that he would order them out of the ring if they did not alter their methods. The paper reported that blame for this messy fight lay squarely with Blake, citing his constant clinching and holding, which was employed to avoid the infighting quality of O'Keeffe. Blake won the fight on points, a verdict "received by a crowded house with something almost akin to amazement", the Sheffield Independent states.

Thus, O'Keeffe lost both the Championship and his Lonsdale Belt. Following this fight, both O'Keeffe and Blake were posted to France and the return fight demanded by the fans could not take place until their return.

On the 28 January 1918, O'Keeffe fought his last professional fight, defeating Blake to win the Lonsdale Belt outright along with an N.S.C Pension.

In an article two days later, the Sportsman reported on the tributes being paid to O'Keeffe at the N.S.C. "No more popular ring victor in recent years has been seen than Sergt Pat O'Keeffe", it begins. Arthur Frederick Bettinson, one of the founding members of the Club remarked on O'Keeffe's exploits, remembering his name on the belt in both 1914 and 1918 and congratulated him as a sportsman and a man. O'Keeffe replied to these tributes modestly, saying that securing the Lonsdale Belt as his own was one of his key ambitions in his career. He would now concentrate on charity and family he said. O'Keeffe retired from professional boxing having made many lifelong friends.

Military service during World War I
.
At the start of 1915, O'Keeffe joined the 1st Surrey Rifles. He was a Physical Training Instructor and Recruiting Sergeant.

This is an excerpt from an Article about O'Keeffe's recruiting skill:

He found Army life at the Regiment's home at Camberwell suited his boxing training well. With good, plain food, strict routine and drill, plenty of sparring partners, and ample space to train, he thrived in a friendly atmosphere where he was very popular with the men.

O'Keeffe and other boxer-turned-soldiers planned activities to help boost the morale of injured troops. One such time was an organised boat trip down the Thames.

Retirement

O'Keeffe remained a public figure for many years. He took a seat on the inaugural British Boxing Board of Control with fellow ex- champion boxers Billy Wells and Jim Driscoll. He participated in charity events, such as boxing an Aston Villa footballer player, refereed amateur tournaments and took part in charity exhibition matches, most notably with his old rival Bombardier Billy Wells. These exhibitions could some times get heated, with O'Keeffe said to have once shouted "Stop it Billy! - I'm not the Kaiser!". O'Keeffe was a regular star spectator at big bouts. He also had his own boxing column in the Daily Herald for a while

O'Keeffe carried on working. He was engaged in the licensing business, was a Publican and was involved in bookmaking. The French and British armies employed him as a boxing instructor in 1925.

In March 1938, the N.S.C. moved into new premises in Piccadilly and held a banquet to honour the occasion. There were hosts of fighters presented including many of the old timers, Jimmy Wilde, Billy Wells, Teddy Baldock, Pedlar Palmer, Tancy Lee, Johnny Basham and O'Keeffe.

O’Keeffe died 16 August 1960 at the Mount Vernon Hospital in Middlesex, aged 77.

Professional boxing record

O'Keeffe's professional boxing record can be summarised as follows:

| style="text-align:center;" colspan="8"|Notable bouts
|-  style="text-align:center; background:#e3e3e3;"
|  style="border-style:none none solid solid; "|Res.
|  style="border-style:none none solid solid; "|Record
|  style="border-style:none none solid solid; "|Opponent
|  style="border-style:none none solid solid; "|Type
|  style="border-style:none none solid solid; "|Round
|  style="border-style:none none solid solid; "|Date
|  style="border-style:none none solid solid; "|Location
|  style="border-style:none none solid solid; "|Notes
|- align=center
|Win
|77-24-7
|align=left|
|
|
|
|align=left|
|align=left|
|- align=center
|loss
|75-23-7
|align=left|
|
|
|
|align=left|
|align=left|
|- align=center
|win
|60-23-7
|align=left|
|
|
|
|align=left|
|align=left|
|- align=center
|loss
|60-22-7
|align=left|
|
|
|
|align=left|
|align=left|
|-align=center
|loss
|59-20-7
|align=left|
|
|
|
|align=left|
|align=left|
|-align=center
|loss
|48-14-6
|align=left|
|
|
|
|align=left|
|align=left|
|-align=center
|style="background:#abcdef;"|Draw
|48-11-4
|align=left|
|
|
|
|align=left|
|align=left|
|-align=center
|win
|28-10-4
|align=left|
|
|
|
|align=left|
|align=left|
|-align=center
|win
|6-1-0
|align=left|
|
|
|
|align=left|
|align=left|

See also 
 List of British middleweight boxing champions
 List of British welterweight boxing champions
 Lonsdale Belt

References

General references

Video 

 Pat O'Keeffe vs Billy Wells-British Army exhibition match-1916 From British Pathe
 Soldier Boxer Corpl Pat O'keefe To Fight Sullivan (1914-1918) From British Pathe

External links
 

|-

1883 births
1960 deaths
English male boxers
People from Canning Town
Welterweight boxers
Middleweight boxers
Boxers from Greater London
British Army personnel of World War I